Talisay may refer to:

Places in the Philippines
Talisay, Batangas
Talisay, Camarines Norte
Talisay, Cebu
Talisay, Negros Occidental

Other uses
Talisay, the Filipino common name for the tree Terminalia catappa